Brain Games is a collection of memory video games programmed by Larry Kaplan and released by Atari, Inc. for the Atari 2600 in 1978. It is a group of memory games, in which the player is faced with outwitting the computer in sound and picture puzzles.  It can be played as either a one or two player game. In place of using the standard joystick, Brain Games utilizes the 12-button keypad controller.

Brain Games was suggested in the 1984 book Clinical Management of Memory Problems as an effective clinical device for memory retraining exercises. Noted for having a variety of useful games, patients would be faced with auditory and visual cues that may improve spatial reasoning.

Gameplay

Featuring a total of 19 games, the catalog of Brain Games includes a variety of memory games where the player must focus on a series of ciphers, symbols, and musical notes. Each game has several options for altering the "difficulty switches", which add different aspects of challenge and have the following progression:

"Touch Me", which is the video version of the 1974 arcade game of the same name, was the precursor for the handheld game Simon, in which the player must match a sequence of tones, and the computer would add a new note upon each successive turn. This continues up until the player completes a 32 consecutive note execution. In "Find Me", the player must detect subtle differences in the figures as they are flashed on the screen; in "Picture Me", the player must memorize the placement of the picture sets, which the computer then rearranges. "Count Me" requires the player to match a sequence of digits played by the computer; upon correctly ordering the digits, the computer adds a new digit to the sequence. "Add Me" also utilizes numeric digits as part of the challenge, although the player must determine the sum the digits presented by the computer. Finally, "Play Me", which turns the 12-button keypad controller into a musical instrument, allows players to play the songs "Happy Birthday to You", "Twinkle, Twinkle, Little Star", and "Three Blind Mice". If two keypad controllers are plugged in, the players can play a duet with "Row Your Boat" as well. Adding to the timed challenges are "diabolical distractions", such as loud noises.

Atari later released a handheld version of Touch Me.

Reception
In his 2011 book, Classic Home Video Games, 1972-1984: A Complete Reference Guide, Brett Weiss said of Brain Games that "Despite the variety of options, Brain Games is limited in scope".

Legacy
Brain Games was re-released bundled with BASIC Programming and two keypad controllers in the Back To School Pak in 1978.

See also

List of Atari 2600 games

References

Sources

1978 video games
Atari 2600 games
Puzzle video games
Video games developed in the United States